Central Tech School was a high school in Erie, Pennsylvania, in the United States. Originally named Central High School, it was the result of the merger of Academy High School and Technical Memorial High School after the conclusion of the 1992–1993 academic year when Academy closed. Around 1994, Central was renamed Central Tech.

The attendance was roughly 1,000 students, and offered 21 Career and Technical courses. The school's mascot was a Falcon. It was the Erie School District's regional vocational-technical school before it was renamed Erie High School, after the merger of Strong Vincent High School and East High School in 2017.

In 2017, Central Tech High School was renamed Erie High School (Pennsylvania) when the School District of the City of Erie consolidated all of its high schools—with the exception of Northwest Pennsylvania Collegiate Academy.

Earlier history

When occupancy of newly built Academy High School was delayed in the fall of 1919, those students shared facilities with Central through June 1920.

Soccer team

The Central Tech soccer team, is an association football team. The Class of 2014 is the school's most successful, having won a share of the Region AAA title in District 10, during the 2013 season.

Notable alumni
Fred Biletnikoff, former NFL wide receiver who is in the Pro Football Hall of Fame. The Fred Biletnikoff Award is given out yearly to college's best wide receiver.

References

External links
Central High School Official Website
Erie School District Profile of Central High
Pennsylvania Department of Education Academic Achievement Report for Central High School, 2005-2006

Public high schools in Pennsylvania
Education in Erie, Pennsylvania
Educational institutions established in 1957
Schools in Erie County, Pennsylvania
1957 establishments in Pennsylvania